Langenbach bei Kirburg is an Ortsgemeinde – a community belonging to a Verbandsgemeinde – in the Westerwaldkreis in Rhineland-Palatinate, Germany.

Geography

The community lies in the Westerwald between Limburg and Siegen on the boundary with North Rhine-Westphalia. The Langenbach, which belongs to the Sieg drainage basin, flows through the municipal area. Langenbach bei Kirburg belongs to the Verbandsgemeinde of Bad Marienberg, a kind of collective municipality.
Its seat is in the like-named town.

History
In 1261, Langenbach bei Kirburg had its first documentary mention.

Politics

The municipal council is made up of 12 council members who were elected in a majority vote in a municipal election on 13 June 2004.

Economy and infrastructure

Transport
South of the community runs Bundesstraße 414, leading from Hohenroth to Hachenburg. The nearest Autobahn interchanges are in Siegen and Wilnsdorf on the A 45 (Dortmund–Hanau), some 20 km away. The nearest InterCityExpress stop is the railway station at Montabaur on the Cologne-Frankfurt high-speed rail line.

References

External links
 Langenbach bei Kirburg in the collective municipality’s Web pages 

Municipalities in Rhineland-Palatinate
Westerwaldkreis